Yulianto is an Indonesian name. Notable people with the name include:

Alvent Yulianto (born 1980), Indonesian badminton player
Charis Yulianto (born 1978), Indonesian footballer
Hari Nur Yulianto (born 1989), Indonesian footballer
Kurniawan Dwi Yulianto (born 1976), Indonesian footballer